David Liptak (born December 18, 1949 in Pittsburgh, Pennsylvania, USA) is a composer and music teacher living in Rochester, New York.

Music career
Since 1987, Liptak has been a member of the composition faculty of the Eastman School of Music of the University of Rochester, where he holds the position of Professor of Composition and Chair of the Composition Department. From 1976–1980, Liptak was a member of the composition and theory faculty of Michigan State University, where he initiated and taught courses in Schenker analysis and conducted the student New Music Ensemble. In 1980 he joined the faculty of the University of Illinois, where his duties included directing the Contemporary Chamber Players, a professional new music ensemble, with which he presented a number of premiere performances. Recent residencies have included the Seal Bay Music Festival in the summer of 1999 and the Brevard Music Festival during the summer of 1998, where he served as Composer-in-Residence and taught composition.

Liptak’s music has been performed by such ensembles as the San Francisco Symphony, Montreal Symphony, St. Paul Chamber Orchestra, Rochester Philharmonic Orchestra, Chamber Music Society of Lincoln Center, Youngstown Symphony, Sinfonia da Camera of Illinois, and the New England Philharmonic, to name a few. His principal publisher is MMB Music.

Awards and honors
His composition awards include prizes in the 1986 Georges Enesco International Composition Competition and the 1978 Minnesota Orchestra 75th Anniversary Composers Competition, and he was a finalist in the 1982 St. Paul Chamber Orchestra Composition Competition.

References

External links

David Liptak Official Site
Eastman School Faculty Webpage

American male classical composers
American classical composers
21st-century classical composers
20th-century classical composers
Musicians from Pittsburgh
1949 births
Living people
21st-century American composers
20th-century American composers
Classical musicians from Pennsylvania
20th-century American male musicians
21st-century American male musicians